Roy Lester Ebron (August 31, 1951 – September 28, 2014) was an American basketball player who played one season in the original American Basketball Association (ABA).

Career
Ebron played college basketball at Louisiana–Lafayette (then called the University of Southwestern Louisiana).  
He appeared in 40 games for the Utah Stars in the ABA during the 1973–74 season, averaging 6.2 points and 4.4 rebounds per game. 
He played for the Iberia Superstars in the European Professional Basketball League in 1975.

Death

Ebron died on September 28, 2014 at his home in St. Rose, Louisiana.

References

1951 births
2014 deaths
American men's basketball players
Basketball players from Norfolk, Virginia
Centers (basketball)
Louisiana Ragin' Cajuns men's basketball players
New York Knicks draft picks
People from St. Rose, Louisiana
Utah Stars players